Y B Normal? was a Canadian sketch comedy TV show. It originally aired on The Comedy Network between 1998 and 1999.

Its sketches are all set in Aylmer, Quebec.

Cast
P-H Dallaire as various characters
Matthiew Klinck as various characters
Ron Langton as various characters
Paolo Mancini as Mike the easter bunny (season 2, one episode in season 1) and various other characters
Thomas Michael as Hank the easter bunny (season 2, one episode in season 1) and various other characters

Guest cast
Adam F. da Silva
Steve Baskin
Leah Chisholm
Louis Durand

Season 1

Season 2

Episodes

Airings

DVD release summary

Behind the scenes

References

External links
 
The Comedy Network

1990s Canadian sketch comedy television series
1998 Canadian television series debuts
1999 Canadian television series endings
CTV Comedy Channel original programming